Arthur Georges Stanislas Henri Van Doren (born 1 October 1994) is a Belgian field hockey player who plays as a defender for Dutch Hoofdklasse club Bloemendaal and the Belgium national team. 

He is the brother of fellow Belgian international Loic Van Doren. In 2017, he won simultaneously both FIH awards of FIH Player and FIH Rising Star of the Year. At the 2018 Hockey Stars Awards he was named the FIH Player of the Year for the second time in a row.

Club career
He played club hockey in Belgium for KHC Dragons. With this club, he became the national hockey champion in 2011. In 2012, he was honoured with the Golden Stick (category junior male players) by the Belgian Hockey Association. Shortly after he won the FIH player of the year award  in 2018, it was announced he would join his current club HC Bloemendaal from the 2018–19 season onwards. In his first season with Bloemendaal, he won his first Dutch national title by winning the championship final against Kampong. In January 2020, it was announced he extended his stay at Bloemendaal for at least one more season. He won his second league title with Bloemendaal in the 2020–21 season as he was named the best player of the Hoofdklasse season.

International career
Van Doren became European champions with the Belgium under-21 squad in 2012. His first selection for the national team was at the age of 17. With Belgium, he became European vice-champion at the 2013 European Championship on home ground in Boom and at the 2017 European Championship in Amstelveen, Netherlands. He was a part of the Belgian squad which won the silver medal at the 2016 Summer Olympics. In 2016, he won the FIH Rising Star of the Year award, which he won again in 2017 together with the FIH Player of the Year award. He was a part of the Belgian squad which won Belgium its first World Cup and European title. In December 2019, he again was nominated for the FIH Player of the Year Award. On 25 May 2021, he was selected in the squad for the 2021 EuroHockey Championship.

Honours

International
Belgium
Olympic gold medal: 2020
Olympic silver medal: 2016
 World Cup: 2018
 EuroHockey Championship: 2019
 FIH Pro League: 2020–21

Belgium U21
 EuroHockey Junior Championship: 2012

Club
Bloemendaal
Hoofdklasse: 2018–19, 2020–21, 2021–22
Euro Hockey League: 2021, 2022

Dragons
Belgian Hockey League: 2010–11, 2014–15, 2015–16, 2016–17, 2017–18

Individual
FIH Rising Star of the Year: 2016, 2017
FIH Player of the Year: 2017, 2018
Gouden Stick: 2014, 2016, 2017
EuroHockey Championship Player of the Tournament: 2017
FIH Hockey World Cup Best Player: 2018
Hoofdklasse Player of the Season: 2020–21

References

External links
 
 
 
 

1994 births
Living people
Sportspeople from Antwerp
Belgian male field hockey players
Male field hockey defenders
Field hockey players at the 2010 Summer Youth Olympics
2014 Men's Hockey World Cup players
Field hockey players at the 2016 Summer Olympics
Field hockey players at the 2020 Summer Olympics
2018 Men's Hockey World Cup players
Olympic field hockey players of Belgium
Olympic silver medalists for Belgium
Olympic medalists in field hockey
Medalists at the 2016 Summer Olympics
KHC Dragons players
HC Bloemendaal players
Men's Hoofdklasse Hockey players
Expatriate field hockey players
Belgian expatriate sportspeople in the Netherlands
Men's Belgian Hockey League players
Olympic gold medalists for Belgium
Medalists at the 2020 Summer Olympics
2023 Men's FIH Hockey World Cup players